At the FIS Nordic World Ski Championships 2009 in Liberec, Czech Republic, four ski jumping were held with three for men and one for women. It was the first time women's ski jumping took place and was so successful that FIS President Gian Franco Kasper hoped to include the event for the 2014 Winter Olympics in Sochi, Russia with possible inclusion into a team event. American Lindsay Van was the first winner of the women's individual normal hill event, the first North American to medal in ski jumping at the world championship, and the first American woman to medal at the world championships. The three World Cup leaders each won a medal in the men's individual normal hill event with 2008-09 Four Hills Tournament winner Wolfgang Loitzl of Austria earning gold, the first individual of his career at the world championships. Loitzl's teammate Gregor Schlierenzauer would win silver in the same event with both teaming up to win gold in the team large hill event, given the Austrians three medals. Norway would also win three medals with a silver in the team large hill and bronzes from Anders Jacobsen (men's individual large hill) and Anette Sagen (women's individual normal hill). Switzerland and Germany each won two medals. Overall, six nations won medals, including Japan, who had the same team that had won the bronze medal in the team large hill at the previous championships in Sapporo, Japan.

Men's events

Individual normal hill 

21 February. Poland's Adam Małysz was the defending champion, but would finish 22nd. Finland's Harri Olli had the longest jump of the first round with 104.5 meters, but would falter badly in the second round with an 87 m jump to finish 13th. Austria's Thomas Morgenstern, who had the longest jump of the second round with 101.5 metres, fell during landing and finished 8th. Loitzl, second after the first round, won the second round thanks to high judge marks to earn his first individual gold of the world championships.

Individual large hill 

27 February. Simon Ammann of Switzerland was the defending champion, and finished eighth. Because of unstable weather conditions, the result after the first jump stands as the official result. It was the first individual medal for both Küttel and Jacobsen

Team large hill
28 February. The Austrian team of Wolfgang Loitzl, Gregor Schlierenzauer, Andreas Kofler, and Thomas Morgenstern were the defending champions and were able to defend with Martin Koch taking Kofler's place. Loitzl had the longest jumps of both rounds to lead Austria to a repeat victory. The weather was overcast and rainy for both rounds of competition.

Women's event

Individual normal hill 

20 February. This event debuted at these championships. Van is the first American woman to medal at the world championships. Sagen and Gräßler tied for the longest jump in the first round while Van had the longest jump in the second round.

References

External links
 RESULTS from FIS-ski.com

2009
2009 in ski jumping

sl:Svetovno prvenstvo v nordijskem smučanju 2009#Smučarski skoki